A long squeeze is a situation in which investors who hold long positions feel the need to sell into a falling market to limit their losses. This pressure to sell usually leads to a further decline in market prices caused by the supply/demand-imbalance. This situation is less common than the opposite short squeeze, because in a short squeeze, the traders who have bought the short contracts have a legal obligation to settle with the promised shares. A trader who is 'long' in a long squeeze has no such obligation, but may sell out of fear of further losses. Other investors may see the rapid decline in price as irrational and a buying opportunity (more often than a rapid rise in price seen as a shorting opportunity). However, in times of significant market turmoil, identifying a long squeeze becomes of more practical interest rather than merely an investment opportunity. In 2008, Bear Stearns was wiped out after market rumors that the company had cash concerns. Investors started selling the scrip, resulting in a long squeeze, which triggered many other stop order losses and accelerated the decline of the company's stock.

In 2020, the oil futures market saw a long squeeze when the price of near-month futures for West Texas Intermediate oil fell below $0, causing long holders to be margin-called, forcing the price lower and triggering additional margin-calls, in a manner similar to a classic short squeeze, eventually reaching a bottom of $-37.63 per barrel, before later recovering to nearly $3.

External links 
What is a Squeeze Play?

References

Business terms
Stock market